Since the 1980s, self-styled Green Scouts have appeared in several countries, related to the protection of the environment and in some cases linked to Greens Parties. However, specifically environmentally-minded Scouts have existed since the very earliest days of the movement.

Background
In response to a rash of devastating fires in the late nineteenth and early twentieth centuries, the State of Michigan established a group of Boy Scouts called the Michigan Forest Scouts in 1912. A similar group, with nearly identical badges, was later established in the State of New York. The purpose of these organizations was not character building, as it was with the Boy Scouts of America, and there were no ranks or merit badges. Instead, the Forest Scouts were charged with protecting the state's forests, and as a result were considered auxiliary fire wardens. Although the BSA typically disapproved of such groups, it was not so with the Forest Scouts. In one of the BSA's annual reports, the Forest Scouts are mentioned with approval and a note is made that "the groups are headed up by Boy Scout men and that the Forest Scouts and the Boy Scouts of America are closely affiliated."

Tenzin Gyatso, 14th Dalai Lama has had direct involvement with Green Scouting on at least two occasions, when on September 3, 1999 he was made a Patron of the Global Movement of Green Scouts in New Delhi, India.

Scouting organizations in Niger include the Association Nigerienne des Scouts de l'Environnement (ANSEN), founded in 2003, which seems to have UN accreditation.

Controversy

The World Organization of the Scout Movement has clearly stated its firm opposition to use of the words "Scout" and "Boy Scout" by Green Scout organizations, and made their position clear to all international governmental and non-governmental organizations involved with the environment, such as the United Nations' Environment Program and the World-Wide Fund for Nature.

"There is room for all in the fight to protect nature and the environment,... but there is no room for creating confusion between that fight and the broader purposes of an established educational organization such as World Scouting and its duly authorized member associations around the globe." explained Jacques Moreillon, Secretary General of WOSM in the 1990s.

Several national WOSM member organizations issue a World Conservation Award.

See also

Traditional Scouting
Green party

References

International environmental organizations
Non-aligned Scouting organizations